Klaus Mäkelä (born 17 January 1996) is a Finnish conductor and cellist. He is currently chief conductor of the Oslo Philharmonic, music director of the Orchestre de Paris, and artistic partner and chief conductor-designate of the Royal Concertgebouw Orchestra.

Biography
Mäkelä was born in Helsinki into a family of musicians; his father is the cellist Sami Mäkelä, and his mother is the pianist Taru Myöhänen-Mäkelä. His grandfather, Tapio Myöhänen, is a violinist and violist. His younger sister Ellen Mäkelä is a dancer with the Ballet de Catalunya.

Mäkelä studied conducting at the Sibelius Academy with Jorma Panula and cello with Marko Ylönen, Timo Hanhinen and Hannu Kiiski. He became interested in conducting at age 12, when he sang in the choir of the Finnish National Opera. He has been a soloist with Finnish orchestras such as the Lahti Symphony Orchestra, the Kuopio Symphony Orchestra and the Jyväskylä Sinfonia. He has performed at Finnish music festivals such as the Kuhmo Chamber Music Festival and the Naantali Music Festival.

In September 2017, Mäkelä first guest-conducted the Swedish Radio Symphony Orchestra. On the basis of this appearance, in December 2017, the orchestra announced the appointment of Mäkelä as its next principal guest conductor, effective with the 2018–2019 season, with an initial contract of three years. Mäkelä is the youngest-ever appointment to a titled conductor post with the orchestra.

Mäkelä was the artistic director of the Turku Music Festival 2018–2022.  In May 2018, Mäkelä first guest-conducted the Oslo Philharmonic. On the basis of this appearance, in October 2018, the orchestra announced the appointment of Mäkelä as its next chief conductor, effective with the 2020–2021 season, with an initial contract of 3 seasons. This appointment marks the first chief conductorship for Mäkelä. In May 2020, the orchestra announced an extension of Mäkelä's initial contract with the Oslo Philharmonic for an additional four seasons, unusual in its timing before the official start of his tenure with the orchestra.

In June 2019, Mäkelä first guest-conducted the Orchestre de Paris. In June 2020, the Orchestre de Paris announced the appointment of Mäkelä as its next music director, effective with the 2022–2023 season, with an initial contract of five seasons.  The original intention had been for Mäkelä to hold the post of musical advisor for the two prior seasons, from 2020 to 2022.  However, Mäkelä assumed the role of music director in September 2021, one year earlier than originally planned.

In September 2020, Mäkelä first guest-conducted the Royal Concertgebouw Orchestra (Dutch acronym, KCO).  Following several additional guest-conducting appearances, in June 2022, the KCO announced the appointment of Mäkelä as an artistic partner for the period of 2022–2027, and subsequently as its next chief conductor, effective with the 2027–2028 season, with an initial contract of five years.

Mäkelä has an exclusive recording contract with Decca, only the third conductor in Decca's history with an exclusive recording contract.  His first recording for Decca was a set of the complete Sibelius symphonies with the Oslo Philharmonic Orchestra.

References

External links
 
 Harrison Parrott agency page on Klaus Mäkelä

1996 births
Finnish conductors (music)
Living people
Sibelius Academy alumni
Cellists
21st-century conductors (music)
21st-century cellists